The Heritage League is a high school athletic league that is part of the CIF Southern Section. It is a non-football league.

Member schools
 Desert Christian School (Palmdale)
 Faith Baptist School (Canoga Park)
 Lancaster Baptist School
 The Palmdale Aerospace Academy
 Santa Clarita Christian School
 St. Monica Academy (Montrose)
 Trinity Classical Academy (Valencia)
 Valley Torah High School (Valley Village)
 Vasquez High School (Acton)

References

CIF Southern Section leagues